The Jieț is a left tributary of the river Danube in Romania. It discharges into the Danube near Bechet.

References

Rivers of Romania
Rivers of Dolj County